Dr. Reinhard Brandl (born 11 August 1977) is a German politician of the Christian Social Union of Bavaria (CSU) who has been serving as a member of the German Bundestag since 2009, representing Ingolstadt.

Early life and education
Following his military service with the German Air Force in Manching, Brandl earned a degrees in industrial engineering from the University of Karlsruhe and the Institut National Polytechnique de Grenoble between 1997 and 2003. For his diploma theses he stayed six months at the Xerox Research Centre Europe in Meylan. He subsequently took part in the doctoral program of the BMW Group and received his doctorate from Technical University of Munich. In 2009, he briefly worked as a consultant with Boston Consulting Group.

Political career

Brand was elected to the Bundestag in the 2009 national elections, succeeding Horst Seehofer.

In parliament, Brandl has been a member of the Defense Committee (since 2009) and the Committee on Digitization (since 2021). From 2013 until 2021, he was part of the Budget Committee, where he served as his parliamentary group's rapporteur on the budgets of the Federal Ministry of the Interior and the Federal Ministry of Defence (2018-2021). He was also a member of the so-called Confidential Committee (Vertrauensgremium) of the Budget Committee, which provides budgetary supervision for Germany’s three intelligence services, BND, BfV and MAD. 

In addition to his committee assignments, Brandl has been a member of the German delegation to the Franco-German Parliamentary Assembly since 2019.

In the negotiations to form a Grand Coalition of Chancellor Angela Merkel's Christian Democrats (CDU together with the Bavarian CSU) and the SPD following the 2013 German elections, he was part of the CDU/CSU delegation in the working group on digital policy, led by Dorothee Bär and Brigitte Zypries. In similar negotiations after the 2017 federal elections, he was part of the same working group, this time led by Bär, Helge Braun and Lars Klingbeil.

Political positions
Throughout his time on the Budget Committee, Brandl has been a proponent of the Merkel government’s policy to refrain from any net new borrowing and instead focus all efforts on achieving a structurally balanced national budget.

Brandl has in the past voted in favor of German participation in United Nations peacekeeping missions as well as in United Nations-mandated European Union peacekeeping missions on the African continent, such as in Somalia – both Operation Atalanta and EUTM Somalia – (2009, 2010, 2011, 2012, 2013, 2014, 2015, 2016, 2017), Darfur/Sudan (2010, 2011, 2012, 2013, 2014, 2015 and 2017), South Sudan (2011, 2012, 2013, 2014, 2015 and 2017), Mali (2013, 2014, 2015 and 2017), the Central African Republic (2014) and Liberia (2015).

In June 2017, Brandl voted against Germany’s introduction of same-sex marriage.

Other activities
 Foundation for Data Protection, Member of the Advisory Board (since 2022)
 Federal Network Agency for Electricity, Gas, Telecommunications, Post and Railway (BNetzA), Alternate Member of the Advisory Board (since 2022)
 Nuclear Waste Disposal Fund, Member of the Board of Trustees (since 2017)
 Bundesverband eMobilität (BEM), Member of the Parliamentary Advisory Board
 Gesellschaft für Sicherheitspolitik (GSP), Vice President
 German Federal Film Board (FFA), Alternate Member of the Supervisory Board (since 2018)
 Federal Agency for Civic Education, Member of the Board of Trustees (2009–2013)

References

Profile at the Bundestag website (German)

1977 births
Living people
Members of the Bundestag for Bavaria
People from Ingolstadt
Karlsruhe Institute of Technology alumni
Grenoble Institute of Technology alumni
Members of the Bundestag 2021–2025
Members of the Bundestag 2017–2021
Members of the Bundestag 2013–2017
Members of the Bundestag 2009–2013
Members of the Bundestag for the Christian Social Union in Bavaria